The Billboard Digital Song Sales chart is a chart that ranks the most downloaded songs in the United States. Its data is compiled by Nielsen SoundScan based on each song's weekly digital sales, which combines sales of different versions of a song by an act for a summarized figure.

In 2021, 28 acts reached number one (including features) with 22 songs. Fifteen artists achieved their first number-one digital song: Tom MacDonald, Gabby Barrett, Masked Wolf, Dua Lipa, DaBaby, Bryson Gray, Tyson James, Chandler Crump, Jack Harlow, State of Mine, Drew Jacobs, John Rich, Mike Rowe, Juice Wrld and Suga. The year was dominated by South Korean boy band BTS: they are the only act to have multiple number-one songs (5), one of only two acts to top the chart for multiple weeks, holding the top 10 digital song sales weeks of the year, and topping the chart for a total of 30 weeks. The band's "Dynamite" opened the year atop the chart, spending eight non-consecutive weeks in the lead (following its ten chart-topping weeks in 2020), making it the longest running number-one song in the chart's history, before being replaced by their own "Film Out". "Butter" later topped the chart for 18 non-consecutive weeks, tying the band's own "Dynamite", and accumulating at least 1,699,900 digital downloads.

Justin Bieber's "Anyone" became his 13th number-one song, breaking his tie with Drake for the most number-one songs by a male artist. It was replaced by singer-songwriter Olivia Rodrigo's debut single "Drivers License" which spent three weeks atop the chart, the only song not by BTS to top the chart for multiple weeks. Taylor Swift's "All Too Well (Taylor's Version)", a re-recorded version of her 2012 single "All Too Well", debuted atop the chart, extending her record as the artist with the most number-one songs on the chart, with 23. Following the release of a remix of The Weeknd's "Save Your Tears" with Ariana Grande, the song jumped to the number-one spot, becoming their sixth and eighth number-ones on the chart respectively.

Chart history

See also
2021 in American music
List of Billboard Hot 100 number ones of 2021
List of number-one Billboard Streaming Songs of 2021

References

External links
Current Digital Song Sales chart

United States Digital Songs
2021
Number-one digital songs